St. Stanislaus Kostka Parish is a former parish in Waterbury, Connecticut, United States, originally designated for Polish immigrants.

Founded on January 30, 1913. It is one of the Polish-American Roman Catholic parishes in New England in the Archdiocese of Hartford. In 2017, the parish was merged with Saint Anne Church in the south end to form All Saints Parish. The building was closed for regularly scheduled worship, and subsequently sold to a Pentecostal church.

History 
On July 7, 1912, Bishop John Joseph Nilan appointed Fr. Ignatius Maciejewski as administrator of a Polish parish in Waterbury. The priest soon celebrated the first parish Mass in the chapel of Our Lady of Lourdes Church, which the Polish immigrants had rented. 

St. Stanislaus Kostka Parish became legally founded on January 30, 1913. Land on East Farm Street was purchased from the Immaculate Conception parish for a church. On August 13, 1914, Bishop John Joseph Nilan named Fr. Theodore Zimmerman first resident pastor. 

The gray granite foundation having been laid, the church cornerstone was blessed on September 14, 1914. The first Mass was celebrated in the completed edifice on October 24, 1915. The completed church superstructure was dedicated on September 26, 1926.

Bibliography 
 
 The Official Catholic Directory in USA

External links 

 St. Stanislaus Kostka - ParishesOnline.com
 Archdiocese of Hartford

Roman Catholic parishes of Archdiocese of Hartford
Polish-American Roman Catholic parishes in Connecticut
Buildings and structures in Waterbury, Connecticut
Churches in New Haven County, Connecticut
1913 establishments in Connecticut
Roman Catholic churches completed in 1926
20th-century Roman Catholic church buildings in the United States